Sanami may refer to:

Sanami Matoh, (born 1969), Japanese manga artist
Mitsuo Sanami (born 1937), Japanese sport shooter

See also
Sanamid, alternative name of Sulfanilamide
Sanamidol, alternative name of Omeprazole

Japanese-language surnames
Japanese feminine given names